Madison Township is the name of fourteen townships in Indiana:

 Madison Township, Allen County, Indiana
 Madison Township, Carroll County, Indiana
 Madison Township, Clinton County, Indiana
 Madison Township, Daviess County, Indiana
 Madison Township, Dubois County, Indiana
 Madison Township, Jay County, Indiana
 Madison Township, Jefferson County, Indiana
 Madison Township, Montgomery County, Indiana
 Madison Township, Morgan County, Indiana
 Madison Township, Pike County, Indiana
 Madison Township, Putnam County, Indiana
 Madison Township, St. Joseph County, Indiana
 Madison Township, Tipton County, Indiana
 Madison Township, Washington County, Indiana

See also
Madison Township (disambiguation)

Indiana township disambiguation pages